Whiffen is an English surname. Notable people with the surname include:

Alma Joslyn Whiffen-Barksdale (1916–1981), American mycologist
Blanche Whiffen (1845–1936), American actress
David Whiffen (1922–2002), British physicist
Kingsley Whiffen (1950–2006), Welsh footballer
Marcus Whiffen (1916–2002), English architectural historian

English-language surnames